Eis Arena Wolfsburg is an arena in Wolfsburg, Germany.  It is primarily used for the ice hockey club EHC Wolfsburg Grizzly Adams. Eisarena Wolfsburg opened in 2006 and holds 4,660 people.

External links
Arena website

Indoor arenas in Germany
Indoor ice hockey venues in Germany
Buildings and structures in Wolfsburg
Sports venues in Lower Saxony